The Holy Modal Rounders was an American folk music group, originally the duo of Peter Stampfel and Steve Weber, who began performing together on the Lower East Side of New York City in the early 1960s. Their unique blend of folk music revival and psychedelia gave them a cult-like following from the late 1960s into the 1970s. For a time the group also included the playwright and actor Sam Shepard.

Origin of the name
Stampfel explained the origin of the name in the webzine Perfect Sound Forever:
We kept changing the name. First it was the Total Quintessence Stomach Pumpers. Then the Temporal Worth High Steppers. Then The Motherfucker Creek Babyrapers. That was just a joke name. He was Rinky-Dink Steve the Tin Horn and I was Fast Lightning Cumquat. He was Teddy Boy Forever and I was Wild Blue Yonder. It kept changing names. Then it was the Total Modal Rounders. Then when we were stoned on pot and someone else, Steve Close maybe, said Holy Modal Rounders by mistake. We kept putting out different names and wait until someone starts calling us that then. When we got to Holy Modal Rounders, everyone decided by accumulation  that we were the Holy Modal Rounders. That's the practical way to get named.

Career
Stampfel and Weber were introduced to each other by Greenwich Village figure Antonia, who also wrote or co-wrote many of their songs. Their first album, The Holy Modal Rounders, released in 1964, contained their version of "Hesitation Blues", the lyrics of which included the first use of the term psychedelic (here pronounced "psycho-delic") in popular music. Shortly after the release of their second album, The Holy Modal Rounders 2, in 1965, they joined Ed Sanders and Tuli Kupferberg in the Fugs for a short time. Their 1965 recordings with the Fugs are on the albums The Village Fugs, Virgin Fugs, and Fugs 4, Rounders Score. Weber wrote the cult classic "Boobs a Lot" for the Fugs, which the Rounders later recorded on the album Good Taste Is Timeless.

After leaving the Fugs, the Rounders re-formed with Sam Shepard and Lee Crabtree to record their third album, Indian War Whoop, and appeared in Shepard's play Forensic. Their fourth album, The Moray Eels Eat the Holy Modal Rounders, recorded in 1968, included "Bird Song" (essentially Ray Price's "You Done Me Wrong" with altered lyrics), which was featured in Dennis Hopper's film Easy Rider. In 1968, the band performed "You've Got the Right String but the Wrong Yo Yo" on the TV series Laugh-In, with appearances by the park-bench oldtimers played by Ruth Buzzi and Arte Johnson.

In 1970, Robin Remailly and Dave Reisch joined the band, which relocated to Boston and then Oregon, adding Ted Deane, Roger North, and Jeff "Skunk" Baxter. Stampfel stayed in New York, but played and recorded with the band on occasion. The band's fifth album, Good Taste Is Timeless, was released by Metromedia in 1971, and their sixth, Alleged in Their Own Time, was released by Rounder Records in 1975.

Later history
Stampfel formed the short-lived Unholy Modal Rounders (1975–1977) with Kirby Pines, Charlie Messing, Jeff Berman and Paul Presti. The group was part of the collaboration Have Moicy!, with Michael Hurley and Jeffrey Frederick and the Clamtones.

After releasing Last Round in 1978, the Holy Modal Rounders broke up once again. Stampfel and Weber reunited briefly to record Going Nowhere Fast (1980).

While working for his wife, Betsy Wollheim, as submissions editor of DAW Books, Stampfel formed the Bottle Caps, releasing Peter Stampfel and the Bottlecaps (1986), The People's Republic of Rock n' Roll (1989), and an album of standards, You Must Remember This (1994). He won a Grammy Award in 1998 for writing part of the liner notes for the CD reissue of the Anthology of American Folk Music. When asked if he had plans for his award, he was quoted in The New York Times as saying "I'm going to put honey on mine and lick it off."

The Holy Modal Rounders continued for 20 years without Stampfel, as the band relocated to Portland, Oregon, while Stampfel stayed in New York. The band toured the United States and Scandinavia but remained rooted in Portland, still billed as the Holy Modal Rounders. Some fans have nicknamed them "The Electric Rounders", since like many other bands they changed their acoustic sound to attract larger audiences.

Stampfel and Weber reunited again under the Rounders name for Too Much Fun in 1999. Since then, Stampfel has released records with the Du-Tels (No Knowledge of Music Required, 2001) and the Bottle Caps (The Jig Is Up, 2004). He continues to be active musically, playing with a number of groups, largely in New York City. Some of the performances from a 2008 tour of the Pacific Northwest were scheduled to be released by Frederick Productions in 2009. In 2010 he released his Dook of the Beatniks album.

Weber reportedly later worked on solo material, according to people who knew him. In 2005, Frederick Productions/Red Newt Records released Steve Weber and the Holy Modal Rounders, B.C. Taken from a 1976 radio show out of Vancouver, BC, this is the only commercial album featuring Weber and the full Portland band in its heyday. A number of Rounders live albums have also surfaced in recent years.

In 2006 a documentary film, The Holy Modal Rounders: Bound to Lose, was released, directed by Paul Lovelace and produced by Sam Douglas. The film offers insight into the lives of Weber and Stampfel and their career as The Holy Modal Rounders. However, after the movie was released Weber went on record saying the film grossly misrepresented him and that the filmmakers deliberately got him drunk to make a fool out of him. Weber said the movie destroyed the Holy Modal Rounders, strained the relationship in the band, and made any future reunion impossible.

Weber died on February 7, 2020, aged 76, in Mount Clare, West Virginia.

Discography

Studio albums
 The Holy Modal Rounders (1964)
 The Holy Modal Rounders 2 (1965)
 Indian War Whoop (1967)
 The Moray Eels Eat The Holy Modal Rounders (1968)
 Good Taste Is Timeless (1971)
 Alleged in Their Own Time (1975)
 Last Round (1978)
 Going Nowhere Fast (1980)
 Too Much Fun! (1999)

Collaboration albums
 Have Moicy! (1976)

Compilation
 I Make a Wish for a Potato (2001)

Live albums
 Live in 1965 (2002)
 Bird Song: Live 1971 (2004)
 Steve Weber and the Holy Modal Rounders, B.C. (2005)

References

External links

1996 Stampfel interview in Perfect Sound Forever
2010 Stampfel interview on Outsight Radio Hours
Peter Stampfel's audio interviews on the podcast The Future And You (in which he describes his expectations of the future), 2006
NPR interview

Psychedelic folk groups
American folk musical groups
Prestige Records artists
Transatlantic Records artists
Elektra Records artists
Rounder Records artists
Freak folk
Musical groups from Portland, Oregon
Freak scene musicians
Don Giovanni Records artists